Nelson Mandela Bay Municipality (or uMasipala waseBhayi) is one of eight metropolitan municipalities (also called Category A municipalities) in South Africa. It is located on the shores of Algoa Bay in the Eastern Cape Province and comprises the city of Gqeberha (Port Elizabeth), the nearby towns of Uitenhage and Despatch, and the surrounding rural area.

The name "Nelson Mandela Bay Municipality" was chosen to honour former President Nelson Mandela.

History
Established on 5 December 2000, the Nelson Mandela Bay Metropolitan Municipality was formed as an administrative area covering Port Elizabeth (Gqeberha), the neighbouring towns of Kariega (Uitenhage) and Despatch and the surrounding agricultural areas. Thus included the following cities/towns/villages:

Demographics and statistics

 
As of the census of 2011, there are 1,152,115 people and 324,292 households in the Nelson Mandela Bay Metropolitan Municipality.

In the 2007 census, 60.4% of respondents described themselves as Black African, 22.6% Coloured, 16.1% White and 0.9% Indian/Asian.

The largest religious groupings are 
Christian (89.4% of residents), no religion (6.1%), Muslim (1.5%), Jewish (0.4%) and Hindu (0.3%).

57.3% of the residents speak Xhosa as their mother tongue. 
Afrikaans is the mother tongue of 29.7%, and 
English, 12.1%.

16.0% of all households are single-person.
The average household size is 3.86.
The median age is 26 years.
For every 100 females there are 91.2 males.
28.2% of the population aged 15–65 is unemployed.
The median annual income of working adults aged 15–65 is ZAR 21 837 ($3,282).

According to the 2009 edition of the municipality's 2006–2011 Integrated Development Plan, manufacturing is the single largest contributor to the local economy (33%), followed by community services (27%).  Tourism represents a key sector of the economy that has increasingly contributed to job creation in recent years, thanks in large part to the municipality's seaside location and its abundance of unspoiled beaches, of which four carry Blue Flag status.

100% of households have access to a source of water within a 200 m radius.  91% of households have access to a basic level of sanitation.  100% of households within the urban boundary have access to a basic level of solid waste removal, and 97% of households in formally demarcated municipal residential areas have access to a basic level of electricity.  The municipality has 41 permanent and satellite clinics, 13 mobile clinics, eight hospitals, 22 libraries, 31 community and municipal halls, 79 sports facilities, 19 beaches, 18 pools, 273 schools, one university (the Nelson Mandela University), four technical colleges and two Further Education and Training institutions.

Main places
The censuses of 2001 and 2011 divided the municipality into the following main places:

Government

The municipal council consists of one hundred and twenty members elected by mixed-member proportional representation. Sixty councillors are elected by first-past-the-post voting in sixty wards, while the remaining sixty are chosen from party lists so that the total number of party representatives is proportional to the number of votes received. In the local government election of 1 November 2021, no party obtained a majority on the council again. The African National Congress managed to form a minority coalition government to govern the municipality. Former councillor and businesswoman Eugene Johnson of the ANC was elected mayor on 22 November 2021, in a coalition consisting of the parties: GOOD, AIM, UDM, DOP, Northern Alliance, Patriotic Alliance and the PAC. She won against the DA's mayoral candidate, Nqaba Bhanga, by 1 vote, as a DA councillor was absent.

During a council meeting on 21 September 2022, Johnson was removed as mayor through a vote of no confidence and succeeded by the DA's Retief Odendaal.

The following table shows the results of the 2021 municipal election.

See also
Algoa Bay

References

External links
Official website of the municipality
Official tourism website of the municipality

 
Metropolitan municipalities of the Eastern Cape
2001 establishments in South Africa